Majalgaon Dam is an earthfill dam on the Sindphana River near Majalgaon, Beed district in the state of Maharashtra, India.

History
Majalgaon dam and Majalgaon Right Bank Canal are components of the Jaikwadi Project Stage II. A dam has been constructed across the Sindhaphana river, which is a major tributary of the Godawari river, also known as Dakshin Ganga. The project was  approved by the government of Maharashtra in 1976 for an estimated cost of Rs 5433 lakhs.

Majalgon Dam is to be built from earth berms on either side of a gated concrete spillway.  The spillway will be approximately 2 kilometers upstream from the town of Majalgaon.  The dam will have three hydroelectric generators, each capable of generating 750 kilowatts. In addition, a canal 165 kilometers long was constructed to irrigate 93885 hectares (ICA) of land in Beed, Parbhani & Nanded districts.

Land acquisition and Rehabilitation
34 Villages were affected by construction of the dam. Out of these 34, 18 are submerged and two are partly under water. The total area of land covered by water is 7813 ha. No forest land was flooded, and affected villages are relocated in 26 new gawthans.

Purpose

 Irrigation
 Hydroelectricity

Specifications
River : Sindhfana river, Kundlika river, feeding from Nathsagar through P.R.B. Canal
Location of Dam: 2 km upstream of Majalgaon
Taluka : Majalgaon
District: Beed

Yield and Utilization
catchment area : 3840 km2
average annual yield : 3888.42 m.cum
75% dependable yield:2833.83 m.cum
gross average annual Utilization : 1185.75 m.cum
% of annual utilization : 72.8%

Dam and reservoir
gross storage: 453.64 m.cum
dead storage: 142.30 m.cum
live storage: 311.34 m.cum
minimum draw down level (MDDL) : 426.11 m. for irrigation 428.35 m. for hydro
M.W.L: 434.8 m
F.R.L: 431.8 m
T.B.L : 435.6 m
River Bed : 405.4 m
Crest (क्रेस्ट) Level  : 423.8 m
Canal Sill Level : 424.7 m

Outlet details
Irrigation outlet: 4950 m on right flank       
Power outlet: 4975.25 m on right flank
                  
type                        Conduct                     Conduct
F.S Discharge               83.8 Cumecs                   20 Cumeecs 
 M.R.B.C
Full supply           83.6 Cumecs
discharge at head 
Length      165 km 
type   Lined 
Command Area
Grass Command area   131520 ha
Cultivable Command Area  119400 ha
Net irrigation Area      93885 ha
Annual Cropped Area      96225 ha

Crops in irrigation area
Sugar cane 3%
Other perennials 1.5%
Rice 10%
L.S.Cotton 25%
Two Seasonal 3%
Rabi Seasonal Jawar 15% 
Wheat 25%
Hot weather 3%
Kharif Jawar 12%
gram 5% 

District wise Benefited area (I.C.A. in ha)
Beed                 28300
Parbhani             58385
Nanded               7200
Total       93885

Power generation
F.R.L:431.80 m
M.W.L. (PRESENT): 434.80 m
T.B.L. :435.60 m
area of submergence: 7813 ha.
no. of villages affected due to submergence: 20

Dimensions
Height
above river bed: 31.0 m
above the foundation: 35.60 m
RIVER BED : 405.4 m
Canal sill level : 424.70 m
Crest level :423.80 m
free board (present): 00.80 m
QUANTITY:
earthwork: 5600 T.cum
masonry: 116 T.cum
concrete : 43 T.cum
total length :6488 m
earth dam : 6143.5 m
masonry dam : 344.5 m

Spillway
type : gated ogee spillway
inflow: 19718 cumecs
outflow: 14500 cumecs
length of spillway : 239 m
size of gate : 12 x 8 m
no.of gates : 16

See also
 Dams in Maharashtra
 List of reservoirs and dams in India

References

Dams in Beed district
Dams completed in 1987
1987 establishments in Maharashtra